Dernière danse (meaning "last dance" in French) may refer to:

"Dernière danse" (Kyo song), 2003 single
"Dernière danse" (Indila song), 2014 single